This is a list of ambassadors sent by New Zealand as diplomatic representatives to other countries.

Argentina

The embassy is located in Buenos Aires, Argentina's capital city.  New Zealand has maintained a resident ambassador in Argentina since 1998.  The Ambassador to Argentina is concurrently accredited to Paraguay and Uruguay.

List of heads of mission

Ambassadors to Argentina

Non-resident ambassadors, resident in Lima

 Peter Bennett (1987–1988)
 Barry Brooks (1988–1990)

Non-resident ambassadors, resident in Santiago

 Paul Tipping (1990–1992)
 Frank Wilson (1992–1996)
 David McKee (1996–1998)

Resident ambassadors

 Caroline Forsyth (1998–2001)
 Carl Worker (2001–2005)
 Lucy Duncan (2005–present)

Belgium
The embassy is located in Brussels, Belgium's capital city.  New Zealand has maintained a resident ambassador in Belgium since 1967.  The Ambassador to Belgium is concurrently accredited to Luxembourg and the European Union.

List of heads of mission

Consuls to Belgium
 Ken Piddington (1963–1964)
 Ted Farnon (1964–1965)

Ambassadors to Belgium

Non-resident ambassadors, resident in France
 Dick Hutchens (1965–1967)

Resident ambassadors
 Merwyn Norrish (1967–1973)
 Ian Stewart (1973–1977)
 Graham Ansell (1977–1981)
 John G. McArthur (1981–1983)
 Terence O'Brien (1983–1986)
 Gerry Thompson (1986–1990)
 David Gamble (1990–1994)
 Derek Leask (1994–1999)
 Dell Higgie (1999–2003)
 Wade Armstrong (2003–2007)
 Peter Kennedy (2007–2012)
 Vangelis Vitalis (2012)
 Paula Wilson (2012-2016)
 Greg Andrews (2016–present)

Brazil

New Zealand's foremost diplomatic representative in the Federative Republic of Brazil, and in charge of New Zealand's diplomatic mission in Brazil.

The embassy is located in Brasília, Brazil's capital city.  New Zealand has maintained a resident ambassador in Brazil since 2001.

List of heads of mission

Ambassadors to Brazil

Non-resident ambassadors, resident in Chile
 David Holborow (1978–1981)
 Ian Landon-Lane (1981–1985)
 Barry Brooks (1985–1988)
 Paul Tipping (1988–1992)
 Frank Wilson (1992–1996)
 David McGee (1996–1998)

Non-resident ambassadors, resident in Argentina
 Caroline Forsyth (1998–2001)

Resident ambassadors
 Denise Almao (2001–2006)
 Alison Mann (2006– )

Chile

The embassy is located in Santiago, Chile's capital city.  New Zealand has maintained a resident ambassador in Chile since 1973.  The Ambassador to Chile is concurrently accredited to Colombia and Peru.

List of heads of mission

Ambassadors to Chile
 John G. McArthur (1973–1975)
 Ken Cunningham (1975–1976)

Chargés d'Affaires in Chile
 David Holborow (1976–1978)

Ambassadors to Chile

 Michael Patel (1978–1981)
 Ian Landon-Lane (1981–1985)
 Barry Brooks (1985–1988)
 Paul Tipping (1988–1992)
 Frank Wilson (1992–1996)
 David McKee (1996–2000)
 Richard Mann (2000–2005)
 Nigel Fyfe (2005–)
 Rosemary Paterson in April 2012; start and end dates unknown

China, People's Republic of

The embassy is located in Beijing, PR China's capital city.  New Zealand has maintained a resident ambassador in PR China since 1973.  The Ambassador to PR China is concurrently accredited to Mongolia.

List of heads of mission

Ambassadors to the People's Republic of China
 Bryce Harland (1973–1976)
 Dick Atkins (1976–1979)
 Harle Freeman-Greene (1979–1982)
 Tony Small (1982–1985)
 Lindsay Watt (1985–1990)
 Michael Powles (1990–1993)
 Chris Elder (1993–1998)
 Peter Adams (1998–2001)
 John McKinnon (2001–2004)
 Tony Browne (2004–2009)
 Carl Worker (2009–2015)
 John McKinnon (January 2015–present)

Egypt, Arab Republic of

The embassy is located in Cairo, Egypt's capital city.  New Zealand has maintained a resident ambassador in Egypt since 2006.  The Ambassador to Egypt is concurrently accredited to Algeria, Lebanon, Libya, Tunisia and is Representative to the Palestinian Authority.

List of heads of mission

Resident Ambassadors to the Arab Republic of Egypt
 Rene Wilson (2006–2011)
 David Strachan (2011–2014)
 Barney Riley (2014–2018)
 Greg Lewis (2019 –)

France

The embassy is located in Paris, France's capital city.  New Zealand has maintained a resident ambassador in France since 1957, and a resident Head of Mission since 1949.  The Ambassador to France is concurrently accredited to Algeria and the OECD.

The Permanent Delegate to UNESCO is also accredited through the embassy in Paris; the Head of Mission to UNESCO is usually the Deputy Head of the mission to France.  See: List of Permanent Delegates from New Zealand to UNESCO.

List of heads of mission

Ministers in France
 Jean McKenzie (1949–1956)
 Joseph Vivian Wilson (1956–1957)

Ambassadors to France
 Joseph Vivian Wilson (1957–1960)
 C.E. Beeby (1960–1964)
 Charles Craw (1964–1965)
 Dick Hutchens (1965–1969)
 Paul Gabites (1969–1975)
 John G. McArthur (1975–1979)
 John Scott (1979–1983)
 John G. McArthur (1983–1988)
 Judith Trotter (1988–1992)
 Chris Beeby (1992–1995)
 Richard Woods (1995–1999)
 Richard Grant (1999–2002)
 Adrian Macey (2002–2006)
 Sarah Dennis (2006–)

Germany

The embassy is located in Berlin, Germany's capital city.  New Zealand has maintained a resident ambassador in Germany since 1966.  The Ambassador to Germany is concurrently accredited to Austria, the Czech Republic, Hungary, Slovakia, and Switzerland.

List of heads of mission

Ambassadors to Germany
 Reuel Lochore (1966–1969)
 Doug Zohrab (1969–1975)
 Hunter Wade (1975–1978)
 Basil Bolt (1978–1982)
 Jack Shepherd (1982–1985)
 Ted Farnon (1985–1990)
 Richard Grant (1990–1994)
 Gerry Thompson (1994–1998)
 Win Cochrane (1998–2003)
 Peter Hamilton (2003– )

Indonesia

The embassy is located in South Jakarta, Indonesia's capital city. New Zealand has maintained a resident ambassador in Indonesia since 1968, and a resident Head of Mission since 1961.

List of heads of mission

Consuls-General to Indonesia
 Duncan McFadyen Rae (1961–1963)

Chargés d'Affaires in Indonesia
 Duncan McFadyen Rae (1963)
 Paul Edmonds (1963–1964)

Ministers in Indonesia
 Reuel Lochore (1964–1966)

Ambassadors to Indonesia
 Bill Challis (1968–1971)
 Basil Bolt (1971–1973)
 Ray Jermyn (1973–1976)
 Roger Peren (1976–1980)
 Richard Nottage (1980–1982)
 Michael Powles (1982–1986)
 Gordon Parkinson (1986–1990)
 Neil Walter (1990–1994)
 Tim Groser (1994–1997)
 Michael Green (1997–2001)
 Chris Elder (2001–2006)
 Phillip Gibson (2006–)

Iran

The embassy is located in Tehran, Iran's capital city.  New Zealand has maintained a resident ambassador in Iran since 1975.  The Ambassador to Iran is concurrently accredited to Afghanistan and Pakistan.

List of heads of mission

Ambassadors to Iran
 Bruce Brown (1975–1978)
 Chris Beeby (1978–1980)

Chargés d'Affaires in Iran
 Graeme Ammundsen (1980–1982)

Ambassadors to Iran
 Don Harper (1982–1984)
 Richard Woods (1984–1987)
 John Wood (1987–1990)
 Laurie Markes (1990–1993)
 John Hayes (1993–1995)
 Daniel Richards (1995–1998)
 Warwick Hawker (1998–2002)
 Niels Holm (2002–2005)
 Hamish MacMaster (2005–2008)
 Eamonn O'Shaughnessy 
 Hamish MacMaster
 Mike Walsh (2021–  )

Italy

The embassy is located in Rome, Italy's capital city.  New Zealand has maintained a resident ambassador in Italy since 1966.  The Ambassador to Italy is concurrently accredited to Bosnia and Herzegovina, Croatia, Cyprus, Greece, Malta, Portugal, and Slovenia.

List of heads of mission

Ambassadors to Italy
 Alister McIntosh (1966–1970)
 Ian Stewart (1970–1972)

Chargés d'Affaires in Italy
 Dick Atkins (1972–1973)

Ambassadors to Italy
 Phil Holloway (1973–1976)
 Eric Halstead (1976–1980)
 Jim Weir (1980–1983)
 Gordon Parkinson (1983–1986)
 Tony Small (1986–1990)
 Peter Bennett (1990–1994)
 Judith Trotter (1994–1998)
 Peter Bennett (1998–2003)
 Julie MacKenzie (2003– )
 Trevor Matheson 
 Anthony Simpson (2019–)

Japan

The embassy is located in Tokyo, Japan's capital city.  New Zealand has maintained a resident ambassador in Japan since 1958, and a resident Head of Mission since 1947.

List of heads of mission

Government Trade Representatives in Japan
 Bill Challis (1947–1952)

Chargés d'Affaires in Japan
 Bill Challis (1952–1956)

Minister in Japan
 John Reid (1956–1958)

Ambassadors to Japan
 John Reid (1958–1961)
 E B E Taylor (1961–1965)
 John Scott (1965–1969)
 Hunter Wade (1969–1972)
 Tom Larkin (1972–1976)
 Rod Miller (1976–1983)
 Graham Ansell (1983–1984)
 Roger Peren (1984–1987)
 Richard Nottage (1987–1988)
 Rod Gates (1988–1992)
 David McDowell (1992–1994)
 Maarten Wevers (1994–1998)
 Neil Walter (1998–1999)
 Phillip Gibson (1999–2005)
 John A. McArthur (2005–2007)
 Ian Kennedy (2007–2012)
 Mark Sinclair (July 2012–  )

Mexico

The embassy is located in Mexico City, Mexico's capital city.  New Zealand has maintained a resident ambassador in Mexico since 1983.  The Ambassador to Mexico is concurrently accredited to Cuba, El Salvador, Guatemala, and Venezuela.

List of heads of mission

Ambassadors to Mexico

Non-resident ambassadors, resident in the United States

 Lloyd White (1974–1978)
 Merwyn Norrish (1978–1980)
 Frank Gill (1980–1982)
 Lance Adams-Schneider (1982–1983)

Resident ambassadors

 Peter Fairfax (1983–1986)
 Rodney Denham (1986–1990)
 Bruce Middleton (1990–1993)
 Laurie Markes (1993–1997)
 Bronwen Chang (1997–2001)
 Paul Tipping (2001–2004)
 George Troup (2004–)

Netherlands

The embassy is located in The Hague.  New Zealand has maintained a resident ambassador in the Netherlands since 1967, and a resident Head of Mission since 1950.  The Ambassador to the Netherlands is concurrently accredited to Denmark, Finland, Norway, and Sweden.

List of heads of mission

Consuls to the Netherlands
 J V Brennan (1950–1952)
 C F Shapcott (1952–1957)
 T A N Johnson (1957–1961)
 Jim Hale (1961–1965)

Ambassadors to the Netherlands

Non-resident ambassadors, resident in France
 Dick Hutchens (1965–1967)

Resident ambassadors
 Rex Cunninghame (1967–1972)
 Vince Roberts (1972–1977)
 Gray Thorp (1977–1982)
 Basil Bolt (1982–1988)
 Ken Cunningham (1988–1991)
 Graeme Ammundsen (1991–1995)
 Hilary Willberg (1995–1998)
 Chris Butler (1998–2002)
 David Payton (2002–2006)
 Rachel Fry (2006–2010)
 George Troup (2010–2014)
 Janet Lowe (2014–2017)
 Lyndal Walker (2017–)

Philippines

The embassy is located in Manila, the Philippines' capital city.  New Zealand has maintained a resident ambassador in the Philippines since 1975.

List of heads of mission

Ministers to the Philippines

Non-resident ministers, resident in Hong Kong
 Bill Challis (1966–1968)
 Gray Thorp (1968–1971)

Ambassadors to the Philippines

Non-resident ambassadors, resident in Hong Kong
 Richard Taylor (1971–1975)

Resident ambassadors
 Mac Chapman (1975–1978)
 Barbara Angus (1978–1981)
 David Holborow (1981–1984)
 Paul Cotton (1984–1988)
 Alison Stokes (1988–1992)
 Harle Freeman-Greene (1992–1995)
 Colin Bell (1995–1998)
 Graeme Waters (1998–2001)
 Terry Baker (2001–2004 )
 Rob Moore-Jones (2004–2006)
 David Pine (2006–2008)
 Andrew Matheson (2008–2012)
 Reuben Levermore (2012–2014)
 David Strachan (2014–)

References
 New Zealand Heads of Overseas Missions: the Philippines.  New Zealand Ministry of Foreign Affairs and Trade.  Retrieved on 29 March 2008.

Russia

The New Zealand embassy is located in Moscow, Russia's capital city.  New Zealand has maintained a resident ambassador in Russia since Russian independence in 1992.  The Ambassador to Russia is concurrently accredited to Belarus, Kazakhstan, Kyrgyzstan, Turkmenistan, Ukraine, and Uzbekistan.

List of heads of mission

Ambassadors to Russia
 Gerald McGhie (1992–1993)
 Richard Woods (1993–1996)
 John Larkindale (1996–1999)
 Geoff Ward (1999–2003)
 Stuart Prior (2003–2006)
 Christopher Elder (2006–2009)
 Ian Hill (2009–)

(See also List of Ambassadors from New Zealand to the Soviet Union, for a list of chief diplomatic representatives in Moscow before 1992.)

Saudi Arabia

The embassy is located in Riyadh, Saudi Arabia's capital city.  New Zealand has maintained a resident ambassador in Saudi Arabia since 1985.  The Ambassador to Saudi Arabia is concurrently accredited to Bahrain, Kuwait, Oman, Qatar, and the United Arab Emirates.  Accreditation to Egypt ceased in 2006 when New Zealand opened an embassy in Cairo.

List of heads of mission

Ambassadors to Saudi Arabia

Non-resident ambassadors, resident in Italy
 Eric Halstead (1977–1980)
 Jim Weir (1980–1983)
 Gordon Parkinson (1983–1985)

Resident ambassadors
 Ken Cunningham (1985–1987)
 Win Cochrane (1987–1992)
 Gordon Parkinson (1992–1995)
 Graeme Ammundsen (1995–1996)
 David Payton (1997–2000)
 Laurie Markes (2000–2003)
 Jim Howell (2003–2007)
 Trevor Matheson (May 2007 – 2010)
 Rod Harris (2010–2013)
 Hamish MacMaster (2013–2017)
 James Munro (2017 – 2020)
 Barney Riley (ambassador) (2021 - )

South Korea

The embassy is located in Seoul, South Korea's capital city.  New Zealand has maintained a resident ambassador in South Korea since 1976.  The Ambassador to South Korea is concurrently accredited to North Korea.

List of heads of mission

Ambassadors to South Korea

Non-resident ambassadors, resident in Japan
 E B E Taylor (1962–1965)
 John Scott (1965–1969)
 Hunter Wade (1969–1972)
 Tom Larkin (1972–1976)

Resident ambassadors
 Ted Farnon (1976–1980)
 David Holborow (1980–1984)
 Chris Butler (1984–1990)
 Peter Kennedy (1990–1993)
 Gerald McGhie (1993–1999)
 Roy Ferguson (1999–2002)
 David Taylor (2002–2006)
 Jane Coombs (2006–)

South Vietnam

The embassy was located in the Caravelle Hotel in Saigon, South Vietnam's capital city.  New Zealand first posted a resident ambassador to South Vietnam in 1968, and a resident Head of Mission in 1964.

Although in operation for only thirteen years, during its short history, the mission was one of the most important to New Zealand; from 1964 until 1972, New Zealand fought alongside South Vietnam in the Vietnam War.  When North Vietnam successfully invaded South Vietnam, in 1975, the embassy was closed.  Twenty years later, New Zealand opened an embassy to the unified Vietnam in Hanoi, having been represented in the intervening time by non-resident ambassadors in Beijing and Bangkok.

List of heads of mission

Ambassadors to South Vietnam

Non-resident ambassadors, resident in Thailand
 Sir Stephen Weir (1962–1967)

Chargés d'Affaires in South Vietnam
 Natalie England (1964)
 Arthur Pope (1964–1967)
 Paul Edmonds (1967–1968)

Ambassadors to South Vietnam
 Paul Edmonds (1968–1972)
 Sir Leonard Thornton (1972–1974)
 Norm Farrell (1974–1975)

(See also Vietnam)

Soviet Union

The embassy was located in Moscow, the Soviet Union's capital city.  New Zealand first posted a resident ambassador to the Soviet Union in 1974, and a resident Head of Mission in 1944.

When the Soviet Union collapsed, at the end of 1991, the diplomatic mission and staff to the Soviet Union transformed into one to the Russian Federation.

List of heads of mission

Ministers to the Soviet Union
 Charles Boswell (1944–1950)

Ambassadors to the Soviet Union
 Brian Lendrum (1974–1977)
 Jim Weir (1977–1980)

Chargés d'Affaires in the Soviet Union
 Gerald McGhie (1980–1981)
 Frank Wilson (1981–1984)

Ambassadors to the Soviet Union
 Alison Stokes (1984–1988)
 John G. McArthur (1988–1990)
 Gerald McGhie (1990–1991)

Spain

The embassy is located in Madrid, Spain's capital city.  New Zealand has maintained a resident ambassador in Spain since 1992.  The Ambassador to Spain is concurrently accredited to Morocco.

List of heads of mission

Ambassadors to Spain

Non-resident ambassadors, resident in France
 John G. McArthur (1977–1979)
 John Scott (1979–1984)
 John G. McArthur (1984–1987)

Non-resident ambassadors, resident in Italy
 Tony Small (1987–1990)
 Peter Bennett (1990–1992)

Resident ambassadors
 Paul Tipping (1992–1996)
 Wilbur Dovey (1996–2000)
 Christine Bogle (2000–2005)
 Geoff Ward (2005–)

Thailand

The embassy is located in Bangkok, Thailand's capital city.  New Zealand has maintained a resident ambassador in Thailand since 1961, and a resident Head of Mission since 1958.  The Ambassador to Thailand is concurrently accredited to Cambodia, Laos, and Myanmar.

List of heads of mission

Ambassadors to Thailand

Non-resident ambassadors, resident in Singapore
 Foss Shanahan (1956–1958)

Chargés d'Affaires in Thailand
 Charles Craw (1958–1961)

Ambassadors to Thailand
 Sir Stephen Weir (1961–1968)
 Ian Stewart (1968–1970)
 Eric Halstead (1970–1973)
 Paul Edmonds (1973–1975)
 Richard Taylor (1975–1981)
 Ray Jermyn (1981–1985)
 Bruce Brown (1985–1988)
 Harle Freeman-Greene (1988–1992)
 Phillip Gibson (1992–1996)
 Adrian Macey (1996–2000)
 Alan Williams (2000–2003)
 Peter Rider (2003–2006)
 Brook Barrington (2006– )

Timor, East

The embassy is located in Dili, East Timor's capital city.  New Zealand has maintained a resident ambassador in East Timor since 2005, and a resident Head of Mission since 2000.

List of heads of mission

Representatives in East Timor
 Jonathan Austin (2000–2002)
 James Hill (2008–2011)

Consuls-General in East Timor
 Jonathan Austin (2002)
 Susannah Gordon (2002–2004)
 Peter Guinness (2004–2005)

Ambassadors to East Timor
 Ruth Nuttall (2005–2008)
 Tim McIvor (2008–2010)
 Tony Fautua (2011– )
Jonathon Schwass
Vicki Poole (2015–2018)
Philip Hewitt (2018–)

Turkey

The embassy is located in Ankara, Turkey's capital city.  New Zealand has maintained a resident ambassador in Turkey since 1993.  The Ambassador to Turkey is concurrently accredited to Israel and Jordan.

List of heads of mission

Ambassadors to Turkey

Non-resident ambassadors, resident in Iran
 John Wood (1989–1990)
 Laurie Markes (1990–1993)

Resident ambassadors
 Clive Pearson (1993–1996)
 Ian Kennedy (1996–1999)
 Alan Cook (1999–2003)
 Jan Henderson (2003–2006)
 Hamish Cooper (2006–2009)
 Andrea J. Smith (2009–2012)
 Taha MacPherson (2012–2015)
 Jonathan Curr (2015–2018)
 Wendy Hinton (2018– )

United States

The embassy is located in Washington, D.C., the United States' capital city.  New Zealand has maintained a resident ambassador in the United States since 1961, and a resident Head of Mission since 1941.

List of heads of mission

Ministers in the United States
 Sir Walter Nash (1941–1944)
 Sir Carl Berendsen (1944–1952)
 Sir Leslie Munro (1952–1958)

Chargés d'Affaires in the United States
 Lloyd White (1958–1961)

Ambassadors to the United States
 George Laking (1961–1967)
 Frank Corner (1967–1972)
 Lloyd White (1972–1978)
 Merwyn Norrish (1978–1980)
 Frank Gill (1980–1982)
 Lancelot Adams-Schneider (1982–1985)
 Sir Wallace Rowling (1985–1988)
 Tim Francis (1988–1991)
 Denis McLean (1991–1994)
 John Wood (1994–1998)
 Jim Bolger (1998–2002)
 John Wood (2002–2006)
 Roy Ferguson (2006–2010)
 Mike Moore (2010–2015)
 Carl Worker Chargé d'Affaires a.i., (June 2015 – December 2015)
 Tim Groser (2016–2018)
 Rosemary Banks (2019-2022)
 Bede Corry (2022- )

Vietnam

The embassy is located in Hanoi, Vietnam's capital city.  New Zealand has maintained a resident ambassador in Vietnam since 1995.

List of heads of mission

Ambassadors to Vietnam

Non-resident ambassadors, resident in Beijing
 Bryce Harland (1975–1976)
 Dick Atkins (1976–1979)

Non-resident ambassadors, resident in Bangkok
 Richard Taylor (1979–1981)
 Ray Jermyn (1981–1986)
 Bruce Brown (1986–1988)
 Harle Freeman-Greene (1988–1992)
 Phillip Gibson (1992–1995)

Resident ambassadors
 David Kersey (1995–1998)
 Yan Flint (1998–2000)
 Malcolm McGoun (2000–2004)
 Michael Chilton (2004–2006)
 James Kember (2006–?)
 Haike Manning (2012–2016)
 Wendy Matthews (2016–2020)
 Treden Dobson (2020– )

See also
Foreign relations of New Zealand
List of ambassadors and high commissioners to and from New Zealand
List of diplomatic missions of New Zealand

Notes
 New Zealand Ministry of Foreign Affairs and Trade.

References

 
New Zealand